The Surfers Paradise Transit Centre is the main coach station on the Gold Coast. It is served by long distance coach services to Brisbane, Byron Bay, Coffs Harbour, Lismore, Casino and Sydney operated by Greyhound Australia, NSW TrainLink and Premier Motor Service.

No Surfside Buslines local bus services call at the station, with stops nearby on the Gold Coast Highway. The G:link tram also calls in nearby Surfers Paradise Boulevard.

In 2015, the booking hall was redeveloped as a retail centred named The 4217 with food outlets, a restaurant and a gymnasium.

References

Bus stations in Gold Coast City
Public transport on the Gold Coast, Queensland
Surfers Paradise, Queensland